Sentinum was an ancient town located in the Marche region of Italy. It was situated at low elevation about a kilometre south of the present-day town of Sassoferrato. The ruins of Sentinum were partially excavated in 1890 and the results of the archeological investigation were published by T. Buccolini.

History
The town is best known for the Battle of Sentinum which took place nearby in 295 BC: the Romans defeated a coalition of Samnites, Etruscans, Umbrians and Senone Gauls. During the civil wars of the 40s BC, Sentinum sided with Mark Antony, but in 41 BC was taken and destroyed by Quintus Salvidienus Rufus who was leading troops of Octavian. The town was planned and rebuilt, reurbanized, and continued to exist under the Empire, chartered as a municipium and (as is sometimes supposed) a colonia.

Civic life at Sentinum seems to have collapsed at the time of the invasion of Alaric I and not to have resurged.

Archaeology
The site and its environs have been investigated by teams of the University of Genoa, led by Maura Medri, and the University of Urbino led by Sergio Rinaldi Tufi. The site is protected as the Archaeological park of Sentinum.

The foundations of the city walls are preserved. The archeological investigation unearthed city gates, a road, cisterns, and the remains of houses. Notable cultural finds include several mosaic pavements and inscriptions from the second half of the 3rd century AD, including three important tabulae patronatus:  these are records of legal ratifications of the appointments of official patrons.

Baths (thermae) dating from the early Empire show a large figured mosaic, presently kept at the Museo Nazionale delle Marche. A 2nd-century colored mosaic of Mithra-Sol is conserved in the Glyptothek, Munich; Mithraic bas-relief of animals representing the stages of the initiate's progress were reused in the Church of Santa Croce, and Mithraic inscriptions are recorded.

See also

 Ancient Ostra
 Archaeological Park of Urbs Salvia
 Potentia (ancient city)
 Ricina
 Septempeda
 Suasa

Notes

References

External links
 Sentinum - General Department for Archaeological Monuments in the Marches 

Roman towns and cities in Italy
Archaeological sites in le Marche
Roman sites of the Marche
Tourist attractions in le Marche
Populated places established in the 1st century BC
Former populated places in Italy